Joint locking can refer to:

Joint lock, a technique of unarmed combat
Joint locking (symptom), a medical sign or symptom